Maglaj Fortress is a large castle complex in the Mmunicipality of Maglaj in Bosnia and Herzegovina.

See also

List of castles in Bosnia and Herzegovina

References

Sources

 Mehmed Mujezinović, Islamska epigrafika u BiH, II, Sarajevo-Publishing, Sarajevo. 1998.,str. 244.
 Ismet Bušatlić, Prilozi historiji školstva i obrazovanja u Maglaju i okolini, Naučni skup-historijsko trajanje Bosne i Maglaja, Maglaj, 2008.
 Ivo Bojanovski, Stari grad Maglaj, Naše starine, X, Sarajevo, 1962. i 1963., str. 61. i 62

Maglaj
Forts in Bosnia and Herzegovina
Castles in Bosnia and Herzegovina
National Monuments of Bosnia and Herzegovina
Medieval Bosnia and Herzegovina architecture